Fudbalski klub Ozren Petrovo (Serbian Cyrillic: Фудбалски клуб Oзpeн Пeтpoвo) is a football club based in Petrovo, Republika Srpska, Bosnia and Herzegovina.

It currently plays in the Second League of the Republika Srpska.

External links
 Club at BiHsoccer.

Football clubs in Republika Srpska
Football clubs in Bosnia and Herzegovina